Metafiction is a form of fiction that emphasises its own narrative structure in a way that continually reminds the audience that they are reading or viewing a fictional work. Metafiction is self-conscious about language, literary form, and story-telling, and works of metafiction directly or indirectly draw attention to their status as artifacts. Metafiction is frequently used as a form of parody or a tool to undermine literary conventions and explore the relationship between literature and reality, life, and art.

Although metafiction is most commonly associated with postmodern literature that developed in the mid-20th century, its use can be traced back to much earlier works of fiction, such as The Canterbury Tales (Geoffrey Chaucer, 1387), Don Quixote (Miguel de Cervantes, 1605), "Chymical Wedding of Christian Rosenkreutz" (Johann Valentin Andreae, 1617) The Life and Opinions of Tristram Shandy, Gentleman (Laurence Sterne, 1759), Sartor Resartus (Thomas Carlyle, 1833–34), and Vanity Fair (William Makepeace Thackeray, 1847). 

Metafiction became particularly prominent in the 1960s, with works such as Lost in the Funhouse by John Barth, "The Babysitter" and "The Magic Poker" by Robert Coover,  Slaughterhouse-Five by Kurt Vonnegut, The French Lieutenant's Woman by John Fowles, The Crying of Lot 49 by Thomas Pynchon, and Willie Master's Lonesome Wife by William H. Gass.

Since the 1980s, contemporary Latino literature has an abundance of self-reflexive, metafictional works, including novels and short stories by Junot Díaz (The Brief Wondrous Life of Oscar Wao), Sandra Cisneros (Caramelo), Salvador Plascencia (The People of Paper), Carmen Maria Machado (Her Body), Rita Indiana (Tentacle), and Valeria Luiselli (Lost Children Archive).

History of the term 
The term 'metafiction' was coined in 1970 by William H. Gass in his book Fiction and the Figures of Life. Gass describes the increasing use of metafiction at the time as a result of authors developing a better understanding of the medium. This new understanding of the medium led to a major change in the approach toward fiction. Theoretical issues became more prominent aspects, resulting in increased self-reflexivity and formal uncertainty. Robert Scholes expands upon Gass' theory and identifies four forms of criticism on fiction, which he refers to as formal, behavioural, structural, and philosophical criticism. Metafiction assimilates these perspectives into the fictional process, putting emphasis on one or more of these aspects.

These developments were part of a larger movement (arguably a meta referential turn) which, approximately from the 1960s onwards, was the consequence of an increasing social and cultural self-consciousness, stemming from, as Patricia Waugh puts it, "a more general cultural interest in the problem of how human beings reflect, construct and mediate their experience in the world."

Due to this development, an increasing number of novelists rejected the notion of rendering the world through fiction. The new principle became to create through the medium of language a world that does not reflect the real world. Language was considered an "independent, self-contained system which generates its own 'meanings. and a means of mediating knowledge of the world. Thus, literary fiction, which constructs worlds through language, became a model for the construction of 'reality' rather than a reflection of it. Reality itself became regarded as a construct instead of objective truth. Through its formal self-exploration, metafiction thus became the device that explores the question of how human beings construct their experience of the world.

Robert Scholes identifies the time around 1970 as the peak of experimental fiction (of which metafiction is an instrumental part) and names a lack of commercial and critical success as reasons for its subsequent decline. The development toward metafictional writing in postmodernism generated mixed responses. Some critics argued that it signified the decadence of the novel and an exhaustion of the artistic capabilities of the medium, with some going as far as to call it the 'death of the novel'. Others see the self-consciousness of fictional writing as a way to gain a deeper understanding of the medium and a path that leads to innovation that resulted in the emergence of new forms of literature, such as the historiographic novel by Linda Hutcheon.

Video games also started to draw on concepts of metafiction, particularly with the rise of independent video games in the 2010s. Games like The Magic Circle, The Beginner's Guide, Undertale, and Pony Island use various techniques as to have the player question the bounds between the fiction of the video game and the reality of them playing the game.

Forms 
According to Werner Wolf, metafiction can be differentiated into four pairs of forms that can be combined with each other.

Explicit/implicit metafiction 
Explicit metafiction is identifiable through its use of clear metafictional elements on the surface of a text. It comments on its own artificiality and is quotable. Explicit metafiction is described as a mode of telling. An example would be a narrator explaining the process of creating the story they are telling. 

Rather than commenting on the text, implicit metafiction foregrounds the medium or its status as an artifact through various, for example disruptive, techniques such as metalepsis. It relies more than other forms of metafiction on the reader's ability to recognize these devices to evoke a metafictional reading. Implicit metafiction is described as a mode of showing.

Direct/indirect metafiction 
Direct metafiction establishes a reference within the text one is just reading. In contrast to this, indirect metafiction consists in metareferences external to this text, such as reflections on other specific literary works or genres (as in parodies) and general discussions of an aesthetic issue. Since there is always a relationship between the text in which indirect metafiction occurs and the referenced external texts or issues, indirect metafiction always impacts the text one is reading, albeit in an indirect way.

Critical/non-critical metafiction 
Critical metafiction aims to find the artificiality or fictionality of a text in some critical way, which is frequently done in postmodernist fiction. Non-critical metafiction does not criticize or undermine the artificiality or fictionality of a text and can, for example, be used to "suggest that the story one is reading is authentic".

Generally media-centred/truth- or fiction-centred metafiction 
While all metafiction somehow deals with the medial quality of fiction or narrative and is thus generally media-centred, in some cases there is an additional focus on the truthfulness or inventiveness (fictionality) of a text, which merits mention as a specific form. The suggestion of a story being authentic (a device frequently used in realistic fiction) would be an example of (non-critical) truth-centred metafiction.

Examples

Laurence Sterne, The Life and Opinions of Tristram Shandy, Gentleman 

In this scene Tristram Shandy, the eponymous character and narrator of the novel, foregrounds the process of creating literature as he interrupts his previous thought and begins to talk about the beginnings of books. The scene evokes an explicitly metafictional response to the problem (and by addressing a problem of the novel one is just reading but also a general problem, the excerpt is thus an example of both direct and indirect metafiction, which may additionally be classified as generally media-centred, non-critical metafiction). Through the lack of context to this sudden change of topic (writing a book is not a plot point, nor does this scene take place at the beginning of the novel, where such a scene might be more willingly accepted by the reader) the metafictional reflection is foregrounded. Additionally, the narrator addresses readers directly, thereby confronting readers with the fact that they are reading a constructed text.

David Lodge, The British Museum is Falling Down 

This scene from The British Museum Is Falling Down (1965) features several instances of metafiction. First, the speaker, Adam Appleby (the protagonist of the novel) discusses the change the rise of the novel brought upon the literary landscape, specifically with regard to thematic changes that occurred. Second, he talks about the mimetic aspect of realist novels. Third, he alludes to the notion that the capabilities of literature have been exhausted, and thus to the idea of the death of the novel (all of this is explicit, critical indirect metafiction). Fourth, he covertly foregrounds the fact that the characters in the novel are fictional characters, rather than masking this aspect, as would be the case in non-metafictional writing. Therefore, this scene features metafictional elements with reference to the medium (the novel), the form of art (literature), a genre (realism), and arguably also lays bare the fictionality of the characters and thus of the novel itself (which could be classified as critical, direct, fiction-centred metafiction).

Jasper Fforde, The Eyre Affair 
The Eyre Affair (2001) is set in an alternative history in which it is possible to enter the world of a work of literature through the use of a machine. In the novel, literary detective Thursday Next chases a criminal through the world of Charlotte Brontë's Jane Eyre. This paradoxical transgression of narrative boundaries is called metalepsis, an implicitly metafictional device when used in literature. Metalepsis has a high inherent potential to disrupt aesthetic illusion and confronts the reader with the fictionality of the text. However, as metalepsis is used as a plot device that has been introduced as part of the world of The Eyre Affair it can, in this instance, have the opposite effect and is compatible with immersion. It can thus be seen as an example of metafiction that does not (necessarily) break the aesthetic illusion.

See also 
Fourth wall
 List of metafictional works
 Postmodernism

References

Further reading 
 Currie, Mark (ed.). Metafiction, Longman, 1995.
Dean, Andrew. Metafiction and the Postwar Novel: Foes, Ghosts, and Faces in the Water, Oxford University Press, 2021.
Gass, William H., Fiction and the Figures of Life, Alfred A. Knopf, 1970
 Heginbotham, Thomas "The Art of Artifice: Barth, Barthelme and the metafictional tradition" (2009) PDF
 Hutcheon, Linda, Narcissistic Narrative. The Metafictional Paradox, Routledge 1984, .
Hutcheon, Linda. A Poetics of Postmodernism: History, Theory, Fiction, Routledge, 1988, ISBN 0-415-00705-4.
 Levinson, Julie, "Adaptation, Metafiction, Self-Creation," Genre: Forms of Discourse and Culture. Spring 2007, vol. 40: 1.
Scholes, Robert, Fabulation and Metafiction, University of Illinois Press 1979.
 The Metafiction Database. Metafiction
Waugh, Patricia, Metafiction – The Theory and Practice of Self-Conscious Fiction, Routledge 1984.
Werner Wolf, ed., in collaboration with Katharina Bantleon and Jeff Thoss. The Metareferential Turn in Contemporary Arts and Media: Forms, Functions, Attempts at Explanation. Studies in Intermediality 5, Rodopi 2011.
Werner Wolf, ed., in collaboration with Katharina Bantleon, and Jeff Thoss. Metareference across Media: Theory and Case Studies. Studies in Intermediality 4, Rodopi 2009.

 
Concepts in aesthetics
Concepts in epistemology
Literary concepts
Literature about literature
Metafictional techniques
Narratology
Philosophical theories